The cacholotes are four species of relatively large, heavy-billed furnariids in the genus Pseudoseisura. They are found in shrubby habitats in the South American countries of Brazil, Bolivia, Argentina, Paraguay and Uruguay. They are essentially brown (ranging from deep rufous to pale gray-brown depending on species), and all are crested to some extent.

Taxonomy
The genus Pseudoseisura was introduced in 1853 by the German naturalist Ludwig Reichenbach to accommodate the white-throated cacholote. The name combines the Ancient Greek pseudos meaning "false" and seisoura, a bird mentioned by the Greek lexicologist Hesychius of Alexandria and believed to be a wagtail Motacilla.

Species
The genus contains four species:

†Pseudoseisura cursor (Pleistocene of Argentina)

The allopatric Caatinga and gray-crested cacholotes were formerly considered conspecific under the name rufous cacholote (Pseudoseisura cristata).

References

 
Bird genera
Taxa named by Ludwig Reichenbach